The George VI Ice Shelf is an extensive ice shelf that occupies George VI Sound which separates Alexander Island from Palmer Land in Antarctica. It was named by the UK Antarctic Place-Names Committee in association with George VI Sound.

Further reading 
 J.Loynes, J.R.Potter, J.G.Paren, Current, temperature, and salinity beneath George VI Ice Shelf, Antarctica, Deep Sea Research Part A. Oceanographic Research Papers Volume 31, Issue 9, September 1984, Pages 1037-1055 
 Jenkins, A., and S. Jacobs (2008), Circulation and melting beneath George VI Ice Shelf, Antarctica, JOURNAL OF GEOPHYSICAL RESEARCH, VOL. 113, C04013, doi:10.1029/2007JC004449, 2008 
 M.H. Talbot, OCEANIC ENVIRONMENT OF GEORGE VI ICE SHELF, ANTARCTIC PENINSULA , Annals of Glaciology 11 1988
 Millennial-Scale History of the George VI Ice Shelf, Antarctic Peninsula
 Bentley, M.J.; Hodgson, D.A. ; Sugden, D.E.; Roberts, S.J.; Smith, J.A.; Leng, M.J. ; Bryant, C. 2005, Early Holocene retreat of the George VI Ice Shelf, Antarctic Peninsula,  Geology, 33 (3). 173–176. https://doi.org/10.1130/G21203.1

References

Ice shelves of Antarctica
Bodies of ice of Alexander Island
Bodies of ice of Palmer Land